The discography of Jawbreaker, an American punk rock band active from 1986 to 1996, and again since 2017, consists of four studio albums, one live album, one compilation album, two extended plays (EPs) and eight singles. The group has also contributed multiple songs to various compilations over the years, both during their time together as a band and posthumously.

Lead vocalist and guitarist Blake Schwarzenbach, bassist Chris Bauermeister, and drummer Adam Pfahler formed Jawbreaker while students at New York University, later relocating to Los Angeles where they released their debut album Unfun (1990) through independent record label Shredder Records. Relocating again to San Francisco the following year, they released 1992's Bivouac through the Tupelo Recording Company and The Communion Label. Jawbreaker toured with Nirvana in 1993 and released 24 Hour Revenge Therapy in 1994, attracting the attention of major labels. They signed with DGC Records and released 1995's Dear You, but its polished production and smooth vocals caused significant backlash from the band's core audience. Internal tensions led to Jawbreaker's dissolution in 1996.

Albums

Studio albums

Live albums

Compilation albums

Extended plays

Singles

Retail singles

IIncluded as a bonus track on the 2010 reissue of Unfun.

Promotional singles

Split singles

IA medley including portions of songs originally performed by U2, the Misfits and The Vapors. 
IIIncluded as a bonus with some copies of the Surprise Your Pig: A Tribute to R.E.M. LP.
IIIIncluded as a bonus with No Idea Zine #10 and also as a standalone split.

Music videos

Compilation appearances
Non-album studio tracks released prior to the band's breakup would later appear on Etc. in 2002.

IRecorded at John Henry's Tavern in Eugene, Oregon on June 30, 1993.
IIRecorded at CBGB in New York, New York on May 23, 1993.
II|Recorded at 924 Gilman Street in Berkeley, California on July 3, 1993.
IVMono 16-track demo version recorded July 1994.

Punk rock group discographies
Discographies of American artists